The AtheOS file system (AFS) was originally used in the AtheOS operating system under MBR partition ID , and is now a part of the Syllable and the Syllable-based Wave OS operating system. AFS started with exactly the same data structures as the Be File System, BFS, and extended its feature set in many ways. As such, AFS is a 64-bit journaled file system with support for file attributes. File indexing and soft deletions are also partially supported.

References

Disk file systems